Nura Habib Omer (born December 24, 1988) is a German rapper of Saudi-Arabian and Eritrean descent.
She is known for being part of Die toten Crackhuren im Kofferraum and SXTN.
Following the split of SXTN in 2018, she has pursued a solo career.

Discography

Studio albums

Singles

As lead artist

As featured artist

SXTN

Awards and nominations

Results

See also
 Concert pictures of Nura on Wikimedia Commons

References

German rappers
1988 births
Living people
German women musicians
German women rappers
Naturalized citizens of Germany
Eritrean emigrants to Germany
German people of Eritrean descent
German people of Saudi Arabian descent